Rozier is a surname of French origin.

List of people surnamed Rozier

Clifford Rozier (1972–2018), American basketball player
François Rozier, French botanist
George Rozier, American politician
Jacques Rozier, French film director
J. A. D. Rozier, 30th mayor of New Orleans
Jean Ferdinand Rozier (1777–1864), French-American businessman
Jean-François Pilâtre de Rozier, French balloonist, inventor of the Rozière balloon
Jean-Marcel Rozier, French equestrian
Kristin Yvonne Rozier, American computer scientist and aerospace engineer
Mike Rozier (born 1961), American football player
Philippe Rozier, French equestrian, son of Jean-Marcel Rozier
Robert Rozier, American football player
Terry Rozier (born 1994), American basketball player
Thierry Rozier, French equestrian, son of Jean-Marcel Rozier